Poverty & Public Policy is a quarterly e-only peer-reviewed academic journal published by Wiley-Blackwell on behalf of the Policy Studies Organization.  The journal was established in 2009 with editor-in-chief Max J. Skidmore (University of Missouri at Kansas City) and Dan Stroud (Midwestern State University) as the Managing Editor. Governance of the journal was transferred to the University of Notre Dame's Center for Social Concerns in 2018, and Dr. Connie Snyder Mick assumed the role Editor-in-Chief. In that time, Managing Editors have included Chelsea King and Eleanor Jones. Previous Development Editors have included Geoffrey Burdell. Brianna McCaslin (University of Notre Dame) and Tyler Dixon (University of Notre Dame) serve as current Managing and Development Editors for the journal. The journal focuses on research related to poverty, welfare, and economic inequality worldwide.

The Editorial Board consists of:

Sonia Kapur (University of North Carolina Asheville), Chang Yee Kwan (National Chengchi University), Philip Young P. Hong (Loyola University Chicago), Mukul G. Asher (University of Singapore, Amrita Center for Economics and Governance), Silvia Borzutsky (Carnegie Mellon University), Pamela Herd (Georgetown University), Stephanie Kelton (Stony Brook University), Brij Mohan (Louisiana State University), M. Niaz Asadul (Malaya University), Udaya R. Waglé (Western Michigan University), Catherine Weaver (University of Texas Austin), and Nikolaos Zahariadis (Rhodes College)

To Submit An Article:

Submitted articles cannot have been previously published, nor be forthcoming in an archival journal or book (print or electronic). However, please note that you may submit a paper published in a working paper series or a section of a Ph.D. dissertation if you make clear reference to this fact in a footnote. In addition, by submitting material to Poverty & Public Policy, the author is stipulating that the material is not currently under review at another journal (electronic or print) and that he or she will not submit the material to another journal (electronic or print) until the completion of the editorial decision process by Poverty & Public Policy. Please direct all concerns about terms of submission to the editors.

All submissions to the Journal must be submitted online through the ScholarOne Manuscripts portal at http://mc.manuscriptcentral.com/povpol. Full instructions and support are available on the site. Authors will be prompted to obtain a user ID and password upon their first visit to the site, which is required in order to submit a manuscript. If you require assistance, please click the “Get Help Now” link that appears at the top right of every ScholarOne Manuscripts page.

Submissions should generally fall between 2,500 - 7,500  words, not including citations and appendices (approximately 10-30 pages). All submissions should be saved as “Word” document files, and formatted in 12 pt., Times New Roman font. Abstracts pertaining to submissions should also adhere to these same formatting requirements, and should not exceed 400 words in length. Any submission not complying with these guidelines will be returned to the author before review. 

Poverty & Public Policy follows the most recent edition of the Publication Manual of the American Psychological Association (APA) for style. Please refer to the APA style manual when preparing manuscripts for submission, especially when formatting references and citations. Authors are to make use of endnotes for citation purposes only, and not for comments. Manuscripts that are incomplete or improperly formatted will be returned for correction before review.

Contributors should remove authors’ names from a manuscript to ensure that it remains anonymous and meets the double-blind review process of this journal.

All manuscripts received by the Journal will be evaluated through a double-blind peer review process. The Journal, after receiving comments and suggestions from reviewers, retains the right to accept or reject manuscripts submitted for publication. Due to the number of manuscripts submitted to the Journal, final decisions regarding publications are usually returned no sooner than three months from the date of submission. Any questions or correspondence regarding submitted manuscripts should be emailed.

References

External links 
 

Wiley-Blackwell academic journals
English-language journals
Publications established in 2009
Political science journals
Quarterly journals